The Roslyn-Flower Hill Elementary School (also known as the Flower Hill Elementary School, the Flower Hill Neighborhood School, or simply as the Flower Hill School) was a local, public elementary school located within the Incorporated Village of Flower Hill, in Nassau County, New York. It was operated by the Roslyn Union Free School District.

History

Need for new schools, mid-to-late 1940s 
Following World War II, the United States saw a population boom and the rise of mass suburbanization. The Roslyn area (including the Roslyn section of Flower Hill) was no exception to this, and many new, suburban housing developments were being built around this time, including Broadridge at Flower Hill (which was constructed in the 1940s).

Proposals made, 1948 
In response to the influx of new residents and students within the district's boundaries, Roslyn's then-superintendent, George Edison Bryant, proposed building the Roslyn-Flower Hill Elementary School in Flower Hill (as well as two other new elementary schools in the district). He stated during a 1948 school board meeting that 1,600 homes were located in the district prior to World War II, and there were as many new homes being built following it, and new schools needed to be constructed in order to increase the district's capacity as a result.

Bryant, who at one point was a Flower Hill resident, proposed making this school a 5-classroom neighborhood school to serve children in Flower Hill zoned to attend Roslyn's schools, and serve as a community center for the neighborhood. 

The 1-floor, 5-classroom Roslyn-Flower Hill Elementary School and the nearby Highland Elementary School in Roslyn Estates (which was approved by the district as part of the same project) would be among the first neighborhood schools of their type in this portion of New York State, which were built to resemble a home as opposed to a stereotypical, "institution-like" structure; this design method was used to make the transition from being home to being at school easier for young students.

The school would also feature playgrounds for year-round use.

Land acquired, January 1949 
In January 1949, the Roslyn Union Free School District took ownership of the future school's property.

Plans approved, September 13, 1949 
During a September 13, 1949 school vote, voters in the Roslyn Union Free School District approved the construction of the Roslyn-Flower Hill Elementary School, to be built on the property in Flower Hill purchased by the district that past January. The estimated total cost for the school was $265,000 (1949 USD), as per the amount allocated in the budget for the school's construction.

Roslyn-Flower Hill Elementary School, 1950s – 1980s 
The school was opened on January 12, 1953, and was located at the end of Center Drive in the Broadridge at Flower Hill subdivision at its southern end and Woodland Road in what would eventually become the Wildwood at Flower Hill subdivision at its northern end. 

A flag-raising ceremony took place at 9 AM that morning, during which the students congregated around the flagpole. Boy scouts, girl scouts, and cub scouts were all represented at the ceremony, as well. The flag, which was donated to the Roslyn School District by the parents of the students, was raised, and a bugle was sounded. This was followed by students reciting the Pledge of Allegiance, and then singing "America". Superintendent Bryant then came forward, greeting and speaking to the students.

The ceremony lasted approximately 15-20 minutes, and was short due to the cold weather.

The school was often used as a place in which community meetings were held - such as during a controversial rezoning plan in which would downsize a greenbelt area adjacent to Hempstead Harbor in order to create an industrial park. Over 250 residents were in attendance for that meeting, which took place inside the school.  

The Roslyn-Flower Hill Elementary School served Roslyn students residing in the area between kindergarten and third grade.

The school was designed by the Manhattan-based firm of Moore & Hutchins.

Hepatitis scare, 1974 
In 1974, an incident occurred when a kindergarten teacher in the school contracted hepatitis. As a result of the teacher's illness, children in the school were sent home with letters for their parents, assuring them that the chances that the disease would spread was very remote, and health officials concluded that there was no need for the children to be inoculated.

Closure, 1980 
The school served the community until September 1980, when it was closed, due to the declining enrollment numbers following the baby-boom era; district enrollment totals decreased by 23% between 1966 and 1975. It was the fourth school closed by the Roslyn Union Free School District within an eight-year span due to these enrollment declines.

Many parents in the community were concerned over the district's plans to close the school, and, during a school board meeting on March 13, 1980, the Roslyn Board of Education was presented with a petition signed by 774 residents, protesting the Flower Hill School's closure. 

Despite the community's efforts to keep the Flower Hill School opened, its closure was approved by the Roslyn Board of Education during the next board meeting on March 24, 1980, during which the school board voted 6-to-1 in favor of doing so. Financial burdens were cited by the district as a reason for the school's closure, and it was estimated in 1980 that by closing the school, the district would be able to save roughly $100,000 (1980 USD) annually.

After the school, 1980s – present 
Following the Roslyn School District's closure of the school, the building was briefly used as an early childhood center before that program was moved to the former Village School in the neighboring village of Roslyn.
After its closure, Flower Hill residents and officials attempted to purchase some or all of the property with the intentions of turning it into a neighborhood park, complete with a playground and sports facilities. Their efforts were unsuccessful, as the Village of Flower Hill was unable to secure the highest bid for the property.

In 1982, following Flower Hill's unsuccessful bid for the property, the Roslyn Board of Education sold the vacant school to developers for $620,000 (1982 USD). The sale was approved by the school board in a vote of 1,079-to-344.

Subsequently, the vacant school was demolished, and its property would be subdivided, becoming the Mashady Estates subdivision in the 1980s, and now consists of multiple single-family homes; it was developed by the N & H Development Corporation. This subdivision includes 8 single-family homes on 15,000 square foot (1,400 m2) lots.

Notable alumni 

 Daniel Dorff – composer, clarinetist, and saxophonist.

See also 

 Roslyn High School

References 

Flower Hill, New York
Demolished school buildings and structures in the United States